Plochionus is a genus of beetles in the family Carabidae, containing the following species:

 Plochionus amandus Newman, 1840 
 Plochionus bicolor Notman, 1919 
 Plochionus circumseptus Bates, 1883 
 Plochionus faviger Chaudoir, 1872 
 Plochionus formosus Bates, 1883 
 Plochionus gounellei Maindron, 1906  
 Plochionus incultus Bates, 1883 
 Plochionus monogrammus Chaudoir, 1877 
 Plochionus niger Fauvel, 1903 
 Plochionus pallens (Fabricius, 1775) 
 Plochionus pictipennis (Reiche, 1842) 
 Plochionus pictus Chaudoir, 1872 
 Plochionus quadripustulatus (Dejean, 1825)
 Plochionus rufocruciatus Maindron, 1906 
 Plochionus timidus Haldeman, 1843 
 Plochionus vittula Csiki, 1932

References

Lebiinae